Game Maker's Toolkit (GMTK) is a video game analysis series created and presented by Mark Brown, a British video game journalist. The show examines and explains various aspects of video game design and is supposed to help viewers consider the design of games that they play and to encourage developers to improve their craft. There are also more focused stems of the series, discussing issues of accessibility in video games or level design. The first GMTK video was published in 2014. The series is hosted on a YouTube channel of the same name and it is funded by viewers via Patreon.

Since 2017, Mark Brown also hosts an annual GMTK game jam on itch.io. Each jam has a different theme – a design challenge – and contestants have 48 hours to design and create a video game fitting that theme.

History 
Before starting Game Maker's Toolkit, Mark Brown was a video game journalist. As a freelance writer he wrote for GamesRadar, Wired and The Escapist, among others. In 2010 and 2011 he was a contributor at Eurogamer and wrote video game reviews. Brown joined Pocket Gamer, a British publication about mobile games, in August 2012 as news editor and later as features editor. He left his position as editor-at-large in January 2017 to focus on Game Maker's Toolkit. Since then Brown has written occasionally as a freelancer, and he publishes game reviews on his Patreon page for supporters of Game Maker's Toolkit.

Game Maker's Toolkits first episode, "Adaptive Soundtracks" was published in November 2014. Early episodes were released irregularly, every three to five weeks. Each video discusses a certain issue in video game design and its implementation in specific games. In 2016 and 2017 GMTK episodes became longer, often with a runtime over 10 minutes, and they were published more frequently – there was about three weeks between new videos. Since 2018 Brown has published on average two videos per month.

Brown launched a crowdfunding profile on Patreon in 2015, enabling viewers to support GMTK with small contributions of money every month. In December 2016 he announced that thanks to his backers on Patreon he would be quitting his job at Pocket Gamer and in 2017 he would start working full-time on Game Maker's Toolkit.

In 2016 Brown started a new side-show on his YouTube channel, called Boss Keys. This series explores the layout and design of dungeons in The Legend of Zelda franchise. Each video covers a single game in The Legend of Zelda series. Brown developed a mapping system to describe layouts of the dungeons. In the second season of Boss Keys, which began in July 2018, Brown discusses the layout of game worlds in the metroidvania genre, such as those in the Metroid series.

A second side-show on GMTK channel, Designing for Disability, launched in July 2018. This series explores accessibility in video games, describes obstacles which may prevent some people from enjoying specific games and presents guidelines and practices that make video games more welcoming for players with disabilities. In November 2019 he continued the series with a review of accessibility in games in 2019.

Reception 
Brown's Game Maker's Toolkit videos were covered by video game websites, such as Gamasutra, Kotaku and Rock, Paper, Shotgun. Designing for Disability series is included in Polygons summary of "The best video essays of 2018" and its writer names Brown "one of the most measured and meticulous people" in video game criticism. The Telegraph mentions Brown as one of "20 gaming YouTubers you should be following", describing GMTK as "an intelligent look into the design philosophy behind popular games". An arts magazine Hyperallergic includes GMTK video "The Challenge of Cameras" in its roundup of web documentaries.

Game Maker's Toolkit was also referenced by some video game developers. Nicolae Berbece, designer of Move or Die, recommended Brown's channel during his talk at Game Developers Conference Europe 2016. Riot Games includes GMTK in their list of game design resources.

Game Maker's Toolkit Game Jam  
Game Maker's Toolkit hosts an annual game jam on itch.io since 2017. Competing developers have 48 hours to design and create a video game fitting a theme unveiled at the beginning of the jam. The themes are design challenges.

The first Game Maker's Toolkit Game Jam took place 14–17 July 2017. Its theme was "Downwell Dual Purpose Design". 2,857 developers joined and submitted 731 games.

Game Maker's Toolkit Game Jam 2018 ran from 31 August 2018 to 2 September 2018. The theme for the second jam was "genre without mechanic", inspired by Snake Pass, a platforming game in which the player cannot jump. There were 1,029 submissions from 3,313 creators, who joined.

Game Maker's Toolkit Game Jam 2019 happened 2–4 August 2019. The theme for 2019 edition was "only one". 7,590 creators joined and submitted 2,648 games.

Game Maker's Toolkit Game Jam 2020 took place 10–12 July 2020, with the theme being "out of control". 18,326 game developers joined and 5,477 games were submitted, making it the biggest online-only game jam at the time.

Game Maker's Toolkit Game Jam 2021 took place 11–13 June 2021, with the theme being "joined together". 21,967 people signed up to take part in the Game Jam and 5,817 games were submitted, making it the biggest Game Maker's Toolkit Game Jam to date. 150,077 ratings were given across all entries.

Game Maker's Toolkit Game Jam 2022 took place 15–17 July 2022, with the theme "roll of the dice". 22,077 people signed up for the Game Jam, and 6,168 games were submitted, once again making not only the biggest Game Maker's Toolkit Game Jam, but also the largest game jam hosted on itch.io to date. Additionally, 131,589 ratings were given across all games in the game jam.

References

External links 
 
 
 Game Maker's Toolkit Game Jam on itch.io

Gaming-related YouTube channels
Online edutainment
Video game critics
YouTube channels launched in 2014
British YouTubers
Crowdfunded web series
Game jams